Ted Sutton is an American actor and voice over artist.  He is best known for playing Sergeant Cunningham in M. Night Shyamalan's 2002 film Signs.

Career
Sutton began as a New York actor, but his role in Signs gained him attention, and led to further roles, including guest appearances in 24, Law & Order: SVU, Cold Case, JAG, Charmed, 10-8, and Star Trek: Enterprise.  Sutton played a department store regional manager who took a big cash bribe on The Young and the Restless. Sutton says that role was the most fun he has ever had. He is noted for his distinctive speaking voice.  He played a doctor in Clint Eastwood's Million Dollar Baby.

Filmography

References

External links

 website

Year of birth missing (living people)
Living people
American male film actors
Place of birth missing (living people)